The 1910 Florida football team represented the University of Florida during the 1910 college football season. The season was George E. Pyle's second as the head coach of the University of Florida football team. Pyle's 1910 Florida football team finished its fifth varsity football season undefeated on its home field, with an overall record of 6–1.

Before the season
The team was captained by Earle Taylor, the only five-time letterman in school history.

Schedule

Season summary

Gainesville Guards
The season opened with a 23–0  defeat of the Gainesville Guards.

Georgia A&M
Florida defeated Third District A&M, 52–0.

Mercer
The season's only blemish was a 13–0 loss to the Mercer Baptists. It was Florida's fourth consecutive loss to Mercer. It took until the second half for Mercer to get going.

A former player Roy Corbett sent a letter to The Gainesville Sun congratulating the 1928 team and mentioned the Gators nickname coming from Neal "Bo Gator" Storter. Carl Van Ness's research also posits Storter as the name's origin. Storter himself denied the above and stated the nickname 'Gators' came when a Macon Telegraph reporter declared "Macon to be invaded by a bunch of alligators from Florida" before the game with Mercer in 1910.

The starting lineup was Swanson (left end), Wagner (left tackle), Price (left guard), Storter (center), Barker (right guard), Robles (right tackle), Boule (right end), Edgerton (quarterback), Tenney (left halfback), Taylor (right halfback), Vidal (fullback).

The Citadel
Florida faced The Citadel Bulldogs for the first time and won 6–2. Aside from the loss to Mercer, only The Citadel scored on the Gators when Dummy Taylor was trapped in the endzone for a safety. Dummy Taylor ran 55 yards for the touchdown.

Rollins
Florida beat the in-state rival, 38–0, for the third consecutive meeting.

Charleston

Columbia A. C.
To close the season, Florida defeated the Columbia Athletic Club 33–0, its third successive shutout and 30-point victory. The win for the Gainesville squad over it a Lake City institution, its former home, was the highlight of the season.

References

Bibliography
 
 

Florida
Florida Gators football seasons
Florida football